

Events 
 None listed

Classical Music 
Ludwig van Beethoven
Piano Trio No. 7 (the "Archduke")
Die Ruinen von Athen ("The Ruins of Athens")
Johann Nepomuk Hummel – 12 German Dances and Coda for Redout-Deutsche
Peter Casper Krossing – Symphony in C minor
Giacomo Meyerbeer – Gott und die Natur (oratorio)
Franz Xaver Wolfgang Mozart – Piano Concerto No. 1 in C major opus 14
George Onslow – Duo for Piano 4 hands no 1 in E minor
Ferdinand Ries 
Horn Sonata, Op. 34
3 Violin Sonatas, Op. 38
Piano Concerto No.2, Op. 42
String Quintet, Op. 68
Concerto for 2 Horns, WoO 19
Joseph Wölfl – Piano Concerto No. 6 in D major "Le coucou", Op. 49

Opera
Carl Maria von Weber – Abu Hassan

Births 
January 21 – Mademoiselle Ambroisine, ballet dancer (d. 1882)
February 4 – Aristide Cavaillé-Coll, organ builder (d. 1899)
March 13 – Camille-Marie Stamaty, composer and pianist (d. 1870)
March 23 – Carl Gottfried Wilhelm Taubert, composer (d. 1891)
May 22 – Giulia Grisi, operatic soprano (d. 1869)
July 19 – Vincenz Lachner, composer (d. 1893)
August 5 – Ambroise Thomas, opera composer (d. 1896)
August 25 – August Gottfried Ritter, organist and composer (d. 1885)
August 31 – Adolfina Fägerstedt, ballerina (d. 1902)
September – Charles Frederick Hempel, organist and composer (d. 1867)
September 29 – Adam Darr, guitarist, singer and composer (d. 1866)
October 16 – Gaetano Capocci, conductor and composer (d. 1898)
October 22 – Franz Liszt, pianist and composer (d. 1886)
October 24 – Ferdinand Hiller, pianist, composer and conductor (d. 1885)
November 11 – François Delsarte, operatic tenor and singing teacher (d. 1871)
November 26 – Franz Brendel, music critic (d. 1868)
December 8 – Louis Schindelmeisser, clarinettist, conductor and composer (d. 1864)
December 23 – Yevdokiya Rostopchina, lyricist and noble (died 1858)
undated – Francis Hartwell Henslowe, public servant and composer (died 1878)
probable – James Hill, folk musician (d. 1853)

Deaths 
February 27 – Joseph Leutgeb, horn virtuoso, 78
March 19 – František Adam Míča, composer, 65
April 15 – Ernest Louis Muller, composer
May 12 – Louis-Charles-Joseph Rey, composer and cellist, 72
July 13 – Pierre Laujon, chansonnier (b. 1727)
July 19 – Christian Gotthilf Tag, composer
August 18 – Johann Heinrich Zang, composer
August 20 – Dorothea Wendling, operatic soprano, 75
September 6 
Julien-Amable Mathieu, composer
Ignaz Fränzl, violinist and composer, 75
September 14 – Johanna Löfblad, actress and singer (b. 1733)
December 7 – Ignaz Spangler, composer
date unknown
John Antes, composer, 71
Barbara Ployer, pianist (b. 1765)
Louis-Abet Deffroy de Reigny, composer
Sir Peter Beckford, English peerage, patron of Muzio Clementi, 70
Thomas Ebdon, composer and organist (b. 1738)

References 

 
19th century in music
Music by year